Husen Castle may refer to the following castle sites in Germany:

 Husen Castle (Hausach), ruined castle above Hausach in the Black Forest, Baden-Wurttemberg
 Husen Castle (Syburg), tower house of a former castle in Westphalia